Jonathan Goldstein may refer to:

Jonathan Goldstein (author) (born 1969), North American author and radio producer
Jonathan Goldstein (actor) (born 1964), American actor
Jonathan Goldstein (businessman), a British solicitor and entrepreneur
Jonathan Goldstein (composer) (1968–2019), British composer of music for film and television
Jonathan Goldstein (filmmaker) (born 1968), American filmmaker
Jonathan A. Goldstein (1929–2004), biblical scholar and author
Jonathan L. Goldstein (born 1941), U.S. Attorney for the District of New Jersey from 1974 to 1977
Johnny Goldstein (born 1991), Israeli music producer, singer and member of Israeli band TYP

See also
Jonathan Goldman, American musician
Jonathan Goldsmith (born 1938), American actor